Farid Zoland, also romanized as Zaland) (born 1 September 1951 in Kabul) is an Afghan songwriter and composer. Throughout his career he has collaborated with many musicians from other countries, most notably from Iran.

Early life
He comes from a family of musicians with father Jalil Zaland and siblings Shahla Zaland and Wahid Zaland.

Education
After receiving preliminary education in music from his father in Kabul, Zaland continued a formal education in music at the University of Tehran. He studied music score, theory, and composition at the University of Southern California from 1980 to 1982.

Career
Zoland went on to compose and produce many of the most iconic Iranian songs for major artists like Dariush Eghbali, Ebi, Googoosh, Hayedeh, Leila Forouhar, and Moein. He has also collaborated with American musicians, namely Lloyd Miller.

He has also had minor acting roles.

References

External links
 [ Farid Zaland] at Allmusic

Living people
20th-century Afghan male singers
Afghan composers
Afghan expatriates in Iran
Afghan emigrants to the United States
Iranian songwriters
1955 births